Jens Pørneki (born 19 June 1969) is a Danish rower. He competed in the men's eight event at the 1992 Summer Olympics.

References

External links
 

1969 births
Living people
Danish male rowers
Olympic rowers of Denmark
Rowers at the 1992 Summer Olympics
Rowers from Copenhagen